Profit from the Core: Growth Strategy in an Era of Turbulence is a non-fiction book on business strategy by American business consultant Chris Zook with James Allen. This is the first book in his Profit from the Core trilogy. The book is followed by Beyond the Core released in 2004 and Unstoppable in 2007.

Overview
The authors posit that nowadays many companies try too hard to adapt themselves to the new rules of strategy. What these companies should be doing, instead, is to opt for a course based on an honest and unbiased assessment of their core businesses. Zook and Allen base the book on studying some 2,000 companies and conclude that there are three factors differentiating growth strategies that work from those that don't: (1) managers have to make sure to get everything possible out of the core business, (2) expand into related businesses, and (3) redefine the business before competitors do.

Criticism

—Review by Businessweek

See also
 5 forces model
 Business models
 Competitive advantage
 Coopetition
 Core competency
 Strategic management
Value Migration: How to Think Several Moves Ahead of the Competition

References

External links
Official website

2001 non-fiction books
American non-fiction books
Business books
Harvard Business Publishing books